The first season of the American crime drama series The Sopranos aired on HBO from January 10 to April 4, 1999. The first season was released on DVD in North America on December 12, 2000, and on Blu-ray on November 24, 2009.

The season introduces DiMeo Crime Family Capo Tony Soprano and his family, as well as his troubled relationship with his mother Livia. Also troubled is his relationship with his Uncle Junior, who becomes locked in a power struggle with Tony after the death of the Crime Family Boss, Jackie Aprile. Tony also begins therapy sessions with Dr. Melfi after suffering a panic attack. 

Meanwhile, Tony's daughter Meadow becomes aware of her father's true profession while preparing to get into college, and Tony's nephew Christopher attempts to write a screenplay about his criminal life and anxiously awaits becoming a made man. Due to Junior's plotting of an assassination, Tony also gets embroiled in a plot against childhood friend Artie Bucco, a charming but obsequious restaurateur.

The season won the Golden Globe Award for Best Television Series – Drama, the Primetime Emmy Award for Outstanding Writing for a Drama Series for the episode "College", as well as several other accolades. James Gandolfini and Edie Falco received numerous accolades for their performances, including winning both Golden Globe Awards and Screen Actors Guild Awards.

Cast

Main cast 
 James Gandolfini as Tony Soprano (13 episodes), a capo in the DiMeo crime family that begins suffering panic attacks.
 Lorraine Bracco as Jennifer Melfi (13 episodes), Tony's therapist, to whom he develops an attraction.
 Edie Falco as Carmela Soprano (13 episodes), Tony's beleaguered wife who struggles with the morality of his work.
 Michael Imperioli as Christopher Moltisanti (13 episodes), Tony's young, ambitious cousin by marriage.
 Dominic Chianese as Corrado "Junior" Soprano Jr. (11 episodes), a DiMeo capo and Tony's combative uncle.
 Vincent Pastore as Salvatore "Big Pussy" Bonpensiero (8 episodes), Tony's best friend and a DiMeo soldier.
 Steven Van Zandt as Silvio Dante (11 episodes), a loyal, intelligent soldier.
 Tony Sirico as Paul "Paulie Walnuts" Gualtieri (10 episodes), a short-tempered soldier.
 Robert Iler as Anthony Soprano Jr. (10 episodes), Tony's troublemaker son.
 Jamie-Lynn Sigler as Meadow Soprano (12 episodes), Tony's high schooler daughter who questions her father's occupation.
 Nancy Marchand as Livia Soprano (11 episodes), Tony's petulant mother.

Recurring cast

Episodes

Reception

Critical response
The first season of The Sopranos was met with wide acclaim, receiving a score of 88 out of 100 on Metacritic, and a 98% approval rating on Rotten Tomatoes (with an average score of 9.50/10), the latter site reporting the critical consensus as, "The Sopranos smartly runs an emotional gamut, offering detailed character work and riveting suspense while displaying a flair for both comedy and drama." James Gandolfini was widely hailed for his performance, with Ken Tucker of Entertainment Weekly praising his "magnificently shrewd, wary performance" as Tony Soprano. Deseret News expressed approval for the show's clear insight into the "modern incarnations of family and mortality and ambition." 

Marvin Kitman of Newsday wrote, "It's a great show, the best new series of the year. It's so - dare I say it? - original. It catches you off guard. Basically, it's everything I'm always looking for in drama. It's beautifully written, authentic, without the plastic Los Angeles look. The acting is marvelous. It's funny in a darkly comedic way, involving as a soap opera, and quirky. I never quite know what's going to happen, even though the subject matter is by no means unprecedented for television."

Awards and nominations
51st Primetime Emmy Awards
Nomination for Outstanding Drama Series
Nomination for Outstanding Lead Actor in a Drama Series (James Gandolfini) (Episode: "Pilot")
Win for Outstanding Lead Actress in a Drama Series (Edie Falco) (Episode: "College")
Nomination for Outstanding Lead Actress in a Drama Series (Lorraine Bracco) (Episode: "The Legend of Tennessee Moltisanti")
Nomination for Outstanding Supporting Actress in a Drama Series (Nancy Marchand) (Episodes: "Pilot" & "46 Long")
Nomination for Outstanding Guest Actor in a Drama Series (John Heard) (Episode: "Nobody Knows Anything")
Nomination for Outstanding Directing for a Drama Series (David Chase) (Episode: "Pilot")
Nomination for Outstanding Writing for a Drama Series (David Chase) (Episode: "Pilot")
Nomination for Outstanding Writing for a Drama Series (Robin Green, Mitchell Burgess) (Episode: "Isabella")
Win for Outstanding Writing for a Drama Series (James Manos Jr.) (Episode: "College")
Nomination for Outstanding Writing for a Drama Series (Frank Renzulli) (Episode: "Nobody Knows Anything")

6th Screen Actors Guild Awards
Win for Outstanding Performance by a Male Actor in a Drama Series (James Gandolfini)
Win for Outstanding Performance by a Female Actor in a Drama Series (Edie Falco)
Nomination for Outstanding Performance by a Female Actor in a Drama Series (Nancy Marchand)
Win for Outstanding Performance by an Ensemble in a Drama Series (Entire Cast)

57th Golden Globe Awards
Win for Best Drama Series
Win for Best Actor in a Drama Series (James Gandolfini)
Nomination for Best Actress in a Drama Series (Lorraine Bracco)
Win for Best Actress in a Drama Series (Edie Falco)
Win for Best Supporting Actress in a Series, Miniseries, or Television Film (Nancy Marchand)

4th Golden Satellite Awards
Nomination for Best Drama Series
Nomination for Best Actor in a Drama Series (James Gandolfini)
Nomination for Best Actress in a Drama Series (Lorraine Bracco)
Nomination for Best Actress in a Drama Series (Edie Falco)

Writers Guild of America Awards 1999
Win for Best Drama Episode (Jason Cahill) (Episode: "Meadowlands")

Directors Guild of America Awards
Nomination for Outstanding Directing in a Drama Series (Daniel Attias) (Episode: "46 Long")
Nomination for Outstanding Directing in a Drama Series (Henry J. Bronchtein) (Episode: "Nobody Knows Anything")
Award for Outstanding Directing in a Drama Series (David Chase) (Episode: "Pilot")
Nomination for Outstanding Directing in a Drama Series (Allen Coulter) (Episode: "College")

15th TCA Awards
Award for Program of the Year
Award for Outstanding Achievement in Drama
Award for Outstanding New Program of the Year
Award for Outstanding Individual Achievement in Drama (James Gandolfini) (Tied with David E. Kelley for The Practice)
Nomination for Outstanding Individual Achievement in Drama (David Chase)

References

External links 
 
 

Season 1
1999 American television seasons